The BowMac sign, known as "Toys "R" BowMac" and "Toymac", is a neon sign in Vancouver, British Columbia, with a metal screen depicting the Toys "R" Us logo covering a significant portion of the original sign. It stands at 1154-1176 West Broadway, a Toys "R" Us store. It was designated by the City of Vancouver as a landmark worthy of preservation and revitalization in 1997. The sign is a landmark of Vancouver, but also a topic of contention as unsightly as well as exceptionally large.

Early history

The Bowell McLean (BowMac) car dealership on West Broadway in Vancouver erected the sign above the business in 1958. The orange sign was covered with hundreds of bulbs and neon lights. It was the largest illuminated structure in Vancouver other than the BC Electric Building downtown and recognized as North America's largest freestanding sign. The billboard was visible from 18 miles away. 

However, as the neon craze of 1950s Vancouver began to disappear in the 1960s, many signs were outlawed by stricter bylaws. The BowMac sign stood into the 1990s, when desires to demolish it surfaced. The city's planning and heritage departments opposed the idea, and passed legislation in 1997 to preserve it.

Heritage

In the 1950s, Vancouver was the North American neon capital for its large number of signs, the artisanship involved, and the technology on display. Vancouver was recognisable from the air by the glow. The BowMac was the largest, most recognizable, and most central sign. It has a font, design, and shape distinct to the era. These considerations led to designation as a landmark worthy of heritage conservation in May 1997.

Controversy

The arguments against are that it is ugly and clashes with the multicoloured logo of Toys "R" Us; that it looks ridiculous; that it stands out in the conservative landscape of West Broadway.

Another issue is that the Toys "R" Us sign is exempt from but way beyond the bylaws. The BowMac sign itself is 215% too tall and 1823% larger than the allowed area; the Toys "R" Us billboard covers roughly three quarters of this space.

A third criticism is that the addition of the Toys "R" Us sign to the original BowMac sign compromises its heritage value.

Suggestions that the sign was an earthquake hazard and that it was going to make too much noise and light pollution were addressed; the site was deemed to be acceptably earthquake-resistant, and the power was restricted between 10pm and 4am.

References

Architecture in Canada
Buildings and structures in Vancouver
Billboards
Individual signs
Buildings and structures completed in 1958
Toys "R" Us
1958 establishments in British Columbia